Chromosome 10 open reading frame 67 (C10orf67), also known as C10orf115, LINC01552, and BA215C7.4, is an un-characterized human protein-coding gene. Several studies indicate a possible link between genetic polymorphisms of this and several other genes to chronic inflammatory barrier diseases such as Crohn's Disease and sarcoidosis.

Gene 
The gene spans 142,366 base pairs and is located at the 10p12.2 locus on the minus (-) or sense strand of chromosome 10. It is flanked upstream by the gene ARMC3 and downstream by the gene KIAA1217. These genes are approximately 150,000 bp and 350,000 bp from C10orf67, respectively.

Transcript 
There are 23 alternatively spliced exons, which encode 13 transcript variants. The primary transcript, only 2943 bp, is not well conserved among orthologs, rather, the X2 variant, 3417 bp, has far greater identity with orthologous proteins. This X2 transcript variant contains 15 exons which yield a polypeptide of 551 amino acids.

Protein

General properties 

*depending on post-translational modifications (PTMs)

**From no PTMs - all possible PTMs

The isoelectric point is significantly greater than average for human proteins (6.81).

Structure 
Shown to the right is a predicted tertiary structure of the protein. It is marked by long alpha-helices with several coil regions and beta strands localized to the end of the protein opposite the N- and C- terminal ends.

Expression 

C10orf67 is moderately expressed (50-75%) in most tissues in the body. However, a study on NCBI GEO discussing the influence of interleukin-13 (IL-13) on gene expression found that protein expression dropped to zero in the presence of IL-13 in airway epithelia.

Subcellular localization 
The protein contains a mitochondrial signal peptide localizing it to the mitochondrial matrix. Analysis with subcellular localization software confirmed this finding. However, some orthologs were also predicted to localize in the nucleus. Though the high isoelectric point of the Human protein provides further evidence for the mitochondrial localization due to the high pH of the mitochondrial matrix.

Post-translational modifications

Cleavage sites 
The protein is initially cleaved to remove the 36 amino acid N-terminal signal peptide after it is localized to the mitochondrion.

Phosphorylation 

There are a number of predicted phosphorylation sites, however there is one experimentally-confirmed phosphorylation site at threonine 69. The other phosphorylation sites are summarized in the protein diagram below.

Sumoylation 
There are five predicted sumoylation sites within C10orf67. These are summarized by the following table:

Homology and evolution

Evolution 
C10orf67 has no known paralogs but has many orthologs within eukaryotes and retains significant identity with species as distantly related as invertebrates. Several select orthologs are listed below with some identifying information.

Evolution 

The rate of evolution of C10orf67 was compared to that of fibrinogen and cytochrome c, which represent fast and slow rates of evolution, respectively. The bolded species in the table were selected to represent the fibrinogen and cytochrome c orthologs to determine the rate of evolution of the respective proteins.

The rate of evolution of C10orf67 is very curious in that it follows a logarithmic trend rather than a linear trend, like most proteins.

Clinical significance

Sarcoidosis 
While the function of C10orf67 is unknown, its interactions with IL-13 further suggest a role of C10orf67 in sarcoidosis as the disease is known to involve various interleukins.

Cancer 
While several NCBI GEO profiles examining various factors on gene expression show that C10orf67 is expressed in varying levels in different cancer tissues, the mitochondrial localization may yield some insight as to a clinical function. Mitochondria have been shown to have some influence in cell proliferation. Given the high energy demand from cell proliferation, there have been several hypotheses that the mitochondria may play a role in the cell cycle and that C10orf67, being localized to the mitochondria, may have a hand in this as well.

References 

Genes on human chromosome 10